Cambridge School is a school in Thakur Complex, Kandivali, Mumbai, India. The school is a member of the Ryan International Group of Institutions and was established in 1998.It offers an education from lower kindergarten until grade 10th and sports facilities like a gaming rig, javelin throw and teachers.

Cambridge School offers schooling from pre-primary to class 10th. The school follows the Indian Certificate of Secondary Education (Delhi) syllabus.

See also
 List of schools in Mumbai

References

External links
Cambridge School, Kandivali (East)

Educational institutions established in 1998
Schools in Mumbai
1998 establishments in Maharashtra
Private schools in Mumbai